Serena Maneesh (or Serena-Maneesh) is the debut album by Serena Maneesh. The album was partly recorded in Steve Albini's respected Electrical Audio Recordings studio in Chicago as well as in various facilities in New York City and Oslo. Contributors to the album include Sufjan Stevens, Martin Bisi (who worked with Sonic Youth and Iggy Pop) and co-producer Daniel Smith of Danielson Famile.

The album yielded two singles: "Drain Cosmetics" in June 2006, and "Sapphire Eyes" in October 2006. "Beehiver II" is an alternative version of the song "Beehiver," first released on the band's 2002 EP Fixxations. An alternate version of "Sapphire Eyes," subtitled Serena-Maneesh Refix, was released as a digital single, as a B-side on the "Drain Cosmetics" single, and on the split single with American band Blood on the Wall.

Reception

Critical reception to the album was positive. Pitchfork Media graded the album 8.6 out of 10 and rated the album as one of the Top 50 Albums of 2005. Norway's national newspaper Dagbladet rated it Norwegian Album of the Year, and Allmusic awarded the album 4 stars out of 5.

Track listing
All tracks written by Emil Nikolaisen.

 "Drain Cosmetics" – 3:41
 "Selina's Melodie Fountain" – 5:39
 "Un-Deux" – 1:56
 "Candlelighted" – 6:36
 "Beehiver II" – 4:44
 "Her Name Is Suicide" – 3:44
 "Sapphire Eyes" – 7:09
 "Don't Come Down Here" – 7:20
 "Chorale Lick" – 3:16
 "Simplicity" – 1:56
 "Your Blood in Mine" – 12:09

Vinyl-only bonus tracks
 "Untitled #1"
 "Untitled #2"

Personnel
Emil Nikolaisen: vocals, guitar, bass, samples, organ, vibes, drums, piano, harmonium, mellotron, mandolin
Anders Møller: percussion
David Wallumrød: organ
Anders Salomon Lidal: flute, analog synth
Sondre Tristan Midttun: guitar
Lina Holmström: vocals
Eivind Schou: violin
Hilma Nikolaisen: vocals
Håvard Krogedal: cello, organ
Harald Frøland: guitar
Sufjan Stevens: flute, marimba
Inge Svege: harmonica
Hilde Bialach: cello
Samuel Durling: Indian vibes
Dag Stiberg: sax
Daniel Smith: backing vocals
Asle Eikrem: tamburin

Production
Christian Engfelt: mixing
Marius Bodin: mixing
Morten Lund: mastering
Ingar Hunskaar: pre-mastering
Tommy Akerholdt: drums, co-arranger
Björn Engelmann: mastering
Martin Bisi: samples, mixing
Espen Høydalsvik: percussion, engineer
Greg Norman: sound engineer

Release history

External links
Serena Maneesh@HoneyMilk Artist page (domestic label)
Serena Maneesh website

References

2005 debut albums
Serena-Maneesh albums